Original is a 2009 film directed by Antonio Tublén and Alexander Brøndsted. It won the Golden Goblet for best film at Shanghai International Film Festival. The jury was led by Danny Boyle and included Andie MacDowell, Michelle Yeoh, Huang Jianxin, Xavier Koller, Komaki Kurihara, Andrew Lau and OH Jungwan.

Cast
 Sverrir Gudnason - Henry
 Tuva Novotny - Marie
 David Dencik - Jon
 Dejan Čukić - Max
 Ghita Nørby - Harriet
 Charlotte Fich - Dr Helm
 Jesper Christensen - Bruno
 Magnus Krepper - Berd
 Thomas Bo Larsen - Pedro
 Helle Fagralid - Young Harriet
 Eric Ericson - Bank Chef
 Therese Glahn - Desk clerk
 Saga Gärde - Ebba
 Patrik Karlson - Hockey trainer
 Michalis Koutsogiannakis - Dr Alberto

References

External links
 
 

2009 films
Danish comedy-drama films
Swedish comedy-drama films
2000s Swedish films